Nature Sustainability is a monthly peer-reviewed scientific journal published by Nature Portfolio. It was established in 2018. The editor-in-chief is Monica Contestabile.

Abstracting and indexing 
The journal is abstracted and indexed in:
Science Citation Index Expanded
Scopus
Social Sciences Citation Index

According to the Journal Citation Reports, the journal has a 2021 impact factor of 27.157.

References

External links 
 

English-language journals
Nature Research academic journals
Monthly journals
Online-only journals
Publications established in 2018
Sustainability journals